Aurora Highlands may refer to:

Places
The Aurora Highlands, a master-planned community in Aurora, Colorado
Aurora Highlands Historic District in Arlington, Virginia